The following is an incomplete list of ghost towns, listed by continent, then by country.

Africa

Angola 

 The settlement of Saint Martin of the Tigers (in Portuguese: São Martinho dos Tigres), situated on a peninsula now known as the Tigres Island (in Portuguese: Ilha dos Tigres), was originally a small but well-established fishing village. It was supplied with water from the nearby town of Foz do Cunene, at the mouth of the Cunene River. In the 1970s, Saint Martin of the Tigers was cut off from the mainland by the rising sea levels, and its water supply line was severed; both Tigres and Foz do Cunene were subsequently abandoned. The island, bound by the South Atlantic Ocean and the Tigres Strait, lies in a zone that is ideally suited for ecological projects. The island was mentioned in the BBC documentary "Unknown Africa: Angola".

Central African Republic 

 Goroumo, Beogombo Deux, and Paoua are among the many deserted villages created by the actions of government forces and killings by armed gangs from the years 2005 to 2008.
 Lere, Central African Republic.

Egypt 

 Avshalom, Dikla, Nahal Yam, Netiv HaAsara, Sufa, Talmei Yosef, Yamit, and Pri'el were Israeli settlements in the Sinai built after the Six-Day War in 1967. They were dismantled by the Israeli government after the Camp David Accords in 1978 and the Egypt-Israel peace treaty of 1979 and are today abandoned.

Ethiopia 

 Dallol is a former mining town located in the Dallol crater, where the temperature can rise as high as 104° Fahrenheit (40 °C).

Ivory Coast 

 Grand-Bassam was the French Colonial capital of Côte d'Ivoire until 1896 when it was abandoned by the French Colonial Government. Commercial activity gradually weakened until the city became a virtual ghost town in 1960, the same year Côte d'Ivoire became independent. Today the city has revived somewhat as a tourist center, but it still has the aura of a ghost town.

Mauritania 

 Chinguetti is a former medieval trading center on the Adrar Plateau.

Morocco (Western Sahara)
 La Güera is a ghost town on the Atlantic coast at the southern tip of Western Sahara. It is Western Sahara's southernmost town. It has been uninhabited and partly buried by drifting sand since 2002.

Namibia 

From 1884 to 1915, Namibia was under the rule of the German Empire and was known as German South West Africa. When diamonds were discovered in 1908, German miners flocked to the area, and several new settlements were established, only to be abandoned once the supply of diamonds dried up. The ghost towns that were left behind include:
 Elizabeth Bay
 Kolmanskop
 Pomona

South Africa 

 Eureka City is an abandoned mining town in Mpumalanga. It is now a historical site.
 Diepgezet is an abandoned asbestos mining town in Mpumalanga. It was transferred to tribal land and renamed to Msauli.
 Leydsdorp is an abandoned mining town near Tzaneen in Limpopo province.
 Millwood is an abandoned mining town near Knysna.
 Pomfret, North West is an abandoned asbestos mining town in the North West province.

Sudan 

 In the northeast of Sudan lies the old city of Sawakin. It is now in ruins. It is said to be in restoration now and will reopen as a tourist attraction.

South Sudan 

 Lukangol was destroyed during the 2011 South Sudan clashes. Before its destruction, it had a population of 20,000.

Antarctica and sub-Antarctic islands 

The islands of Antarctica, particularly South Georgia, were popular with whalers during the first half of the 20th century, and many of the settlements on these islands are former whaling stations. Most of them were closed down during the Great Depression, when whaling became unprofitable, and are now abandoned. These settlements include:

Deception Island 

 Whaler's Bay

South Georgia 

 Grytviken
 Husvik
 Leith Harbour
 Ocean Harbour
 Prince Olav Harbour
 Stromness

Asia

Azerbaijan 

 Aghdam, the capital of Agdam Rayon, is a ghost town in the southwestern part of Azerbaijan. In July 1993, after heavy fighting, Agdam was captured by Armenian forces during their 1993 summer offensives. As the town fell, its entire population was forced to flee eastwards. Many Azerbaijanis were killed by Armenian soldiers. In the immediate aftermath of the fighting, the Armenian forces decided to destroy parts of Agdam to prevent its recapture by Azerbaijan. More damage occurred in the following decades when the deserted town was looted for building materials. Agdam is currently a ruinous, uninhabited ghost town. The town's large mosque survives in poor condition.
 Fuzuli
 Jabrayil

Bangladesh 

 Panam City in Sonargaon was established in the late 19th century as a trading center of cotton fabrics during British rule. Here the Hindu cloth merchants built their residential houses. After the Indo-Pakistani War of 1965 and the Muslim-Hindu riot, Panam City has reduced into a vacant community. Today this area is protected under the department of archaeology of Bangladesh. Panam city area was linked with the main city area by three brick bridges – Panam Bridge, Dalalpur Bridge, and Panam Nagar Bridge – during the Mughal period. The bridges are still in use.

British Indian Ocean Territory 

 East Point was a settlement in the atoll of Diego Garcia, and it has been abandoned after the depopulation of the territory, it is restricted to visitors.

Cambodia

 Bokor Hill Station was a resort town built by colonial French settlers in 1921.

China 

 The Kangbashi District of Ordos City, was intended to house one million people, but soaring property prices and lack of infrastructure deterred residents of Ordos from relocating to the newly built-up area, and it now stands largely deserted. In 2010, the population of Kangbashi was around 20,000 to 30,000, a fraction of its total capacity.
 Niya, in the Tarim Basin, was once a major commercial center dating back to around 500–1000 AD.

Cyprus 

 Varosha was once the modern tourist area of the city of Famagusta. It was fenced off by the Turkish army following the Turkish invasion of Cyprus in 1974 and is now under TRNC rule. United Nations Security Council Resolution 550 forbids any attempt "to settle any part of Varosha by people other than its inhabitants", so the area had remained abandoned since 1974, but the Turkish government  reopened the city to visitors.

Gaza Strip 

 Bedolah, Bnei Atzmon, Dugit, Elei Sinai, Gadid, Gan Or, Ganei Tal, Katif, Kerem Atzmona, Kfar Darom, Kfar Yam, Morag, Netzarim, Neve Dekalim, Netzer Hazani, Nisanit, Pe'at Sade, Rafiah Yam, Slav, and Tel Katifa were Israeli settlements established from 1973 to 1990 in the Gaza Strip under the Hof Aza Regional Council; all were evacuated during Israel's unilateral disengagement in 2005.

Georgia

 Armazi, the original capital of the country, was destroyed in AD 736 by the Arab invader Marwan ibn Muhammad and never rebuilt, apart from a church, built in the 12th century but later abandoned. The ruins are now protected.
 Ochamchire was a city of 18,700 people in 1978 but was left largely abandoned by the ethnic cleansing of Georgians in 1992–1993.
 Tkvarcheli is a coal mining town that suffered a drastic population decline as a result of the war in Abkhazia.

India 

 Dhanushkodi, on Pamban Island, was a flourishing tourist town until it was wiped out by the 1964 Dhanushkodi cyclone.
 Fatehpur Sikri was briefly the capital of the Mughal Empire, but was abandoned soon after its completion, and is now a UNESCO World Heritage Site.
 Mandu is a fortress town in Madhya Pradesh, dating back at least as far as 555 AD.
 Old Goa was once the center of Christianization in the east, but it became largely abandoned in the 17th century, due to an outbreak of malaria and cholera.
 Ross Island was the administrative center of the Andaman and Nicobar Islands until the 1941 Andaman Islands earthquake, leaving the settlement in ruins.
 Vijaynagara was possibly the second-largest city in the world in 1500, with around 500,000 inhabitants. It was captured and destroyed by Muslim armies in 1565, and has been abandoned ever since. Hampi is a World Heritage Site within this town.
 Lakhpat was once a bustling port town at the mouth of Kori creek of Kutch. After the earthquake of 1819, the Indus river changed its course of flow resulting in the abandonment of the port by people. The town surrounded by a  fort wall now houses only a few hundred people and a large number of ruined buildings.
 Bhangarh Fort, a 17th-century fort built by King Sawai Madho Singh in Rajasthan was abandoned following a curse, according to legends.
 Kuldhara is an abandoned town near Jaisalmer, Rajasthan.
 Prabalgad, a hill fort near Matheran, Maharashtra which was abandoned due to its difficult access and scarcity of water.
 Madh Fort near Mumbai is a small fort that is in disuse following a decline in its importance.
 Golkonda Fort near Hyderabad was a fort city and the seat of the Qutb Shahi dynasty was destroyed after defeating by Mughal emperor Aurangzeb.

Iran 

 Soltaniyeh was the 14th century capital of the Mongol Ilkhanid rulers of Persia, but is now "a deserted, crumbling spread of ruins".

Japan 

 Hashima Island was a Japanese mining town from 1887 to 1974. Once known for having the world's highest population density (in 1959 at ), the island was abandoned when the coal mines were closed down.
 Ōkuma, Fukushima was a large Japanese town with a population of 11,515 people.
 Ikeshima Island was a mining town in Nagasaki Prefecture. The town had an estimated population of over 10,000, but after the coal mines closure in 2001 thousands left. In 2018 it had a population of 130.

Kazakhstan 

 Chagan, former Soviet air base and urban settlement.

Malaysia 

 Bukit Kutu is a former hill station that was abandoned after being bombed by the Japanese army during World War II.
 Bukit Besi is a former mining town in Terengganu, Malaysia. The population dropped drastically after 1971 when the Eastern Mining and Metal Corporation (EMMCO) closed their operation because the iron ore there was exhausted.
 Kampung Kepayang, in Perak, is almost uninhabited, with only two or three shophouses being in use. This is a result of the widening of the main road, which made it difficult to park a vehicle and resulted in the shops losing business. However, there are still Malays who reside in the village houses behind the shophouses, and the addresses in Simpang Pulai are still written as "Kampung Kepayang".
 Sungai Lembing, Pahang, Malaysia.
 Pekan Papan was once-thriving mining town in Pusing, Perak.

North Korea 

 Kijong-dong

Oman 

 Sap Bani Khamis is an abandoned village halfway up a canyon, accessible only by a narrow path.

Qatar 

 Al-ʽArish is an old fishing village on the Northern coast of Qatar in the Middle East. Situated on the Persian Gulf, it was abandoned in the early 1970s and has since become a ghost town.

Russia 

 Butugychag is a former Gulag forced labor camp, and one of the few camps in which prisoners mined uranium.
 Gamsutl, one of the oldest settlements in Dagestan, abandoned in 2015.
 Khalmer-Yu is a former urban-type settlement in the Komi Republic, disestablished in 1995. In 1993 it was decided to shut down mining operations and to liquidate the settlement by 1995.
 Mologa is a town in Yaroslavl Oblast that was flooded to create the Rybinsk Reservoir.
 Neftegorsk is a former town in Sakhalin Oblast that was almost destroyed in a 1995 earthquake and never rebuilt.
 Kadykchan is a former mining town in Magadan Oblast.
 Kyubyume in Yakutia.

Saudi Arabia 

 Old Town, Al-'Ula, or al-Deera as it is locally called, is now all but a ghost town. It consists of a walled village of about 800 dwellings around the perimeter of the more ancient castle with narrow winding alleys, many of which are covered to shield the people from the heat of the sun. Most of the foundations of the buildings are stone, but the upper floors are made from mud bricks, while palm leaves and wood are used for the ceilings. Although many of these houses were probably rebuilt over time, their foundation is likely to be from the original construction of the town in the 13th century AD.  above historic al-Ula, the town's Castle commands strategic views over the entire valley. It is sometimes referred to as the Castle of Musa bin Nusayr, the Umayyad-era army general who ruled over North Africa and was involved in conquering Andalusia in the early 8th century AD. He is said to have died in this castle on his way from Damascus to a pilgrimage in Mecca in 715 AD. Although the castle was rebuilt more than once during its long history, its origins date back to the 6th century BC. In fact, some of the foundation stones are from the original 2,600-year-old construction (according to signs posted). The castle is currently more of a bastion or watchtower once used to protect the town.
 Albaten
 Tharmida

Singapore 

 A few blocks of HDB flats (apartment flats) located in the Lim Chu Kang area of the island is known to be the only ghost town in Singapore. Named the Neo Tiew Estate (or officially the Lim Chu Kang Rural Centre), it used to house residents before they were moved out of the vicinity in 2002 as part of an En-bloc scheme. Since then the Singapore government has declared it state land and nothing was done to demolish or renovate the flats. The area was used by the Singapore Army as a training facility from 2005–2009 until a newer training facility was built nearby in 2008. The facility was used most recently in 2012 when it was used to shoot scenes for the film Ah Boys to Men. As of today, its fate remains unknown.

Syria

 The city of Quneitra became a ghost town after the 1967 Six-Day War and subsequent Yom Kippur War in 1973. The ruins were left in place, and a museum has been built to memorialize the destruction. Billboards are maintained at the ruins of many buildings and the town is effectively preserved in the condition that the wars left it in.

Taiwan 

 The Sanzhi UFO houses in Taiwan were a set of abandoned pod-shaped buildings built in New Taipei City as a vacation resort. They stood abandoned for thirty years before being demolished in 2010.

Thailand 

 The city of Old Ayutthaya was the capital of the country from its foundation in 1350 until it was sacked and destroyed by the Burmese in 1767. The site is now Ayutthaya Historical Park.

Turkey 

 Ani, in Kars Province, was once the capital of the Armenian Bagratuni kingdom. It has been abandoned since the eighteenth century and is now a museum town.
 Çökene in Büyükorhan district was a village until 2008. It is a site of empty houses after immigration to big cities due to money shortage and unemployment.
 Kayaköy was abandoned as a result of the 1923 population exchange between Turkey and Greece and is now preserved as a museum village.
 Sazak near Karaburun, a district of İzmir Province on the Aegean (western) coast of Turkey, was also inhabited by Greeks, which left the area according to the population exchange treaty. Nowadays Sazak is a total ghost town.

Europe

Albania 

 Qeparo

Austria 

 The village of Döllersheim was evicted and demolished due to the construction of a Wehrmacht training ground.

Belarus 

Many Belarusian villages were abandoned as a result of the Chernobyl disaster in 1986. Most lie inside the Polesie State Radioecological Reserve, Including:
 Aravichy
 Dzernavichy

Belgium 

 Doel is a village in Beveren that was partly abandoned and demolished to make way for the expanding of the Port of Antwerp-Bruges.

Bulgaria 

 Chamla is an abandoned village in the Smolyan municipality
 Dragostin is an abandoned village in Gotse Delchev that was erased from the registers in 2008.
 Sredna is an abandoned village in Gotse Delchev that was erased from the registers in 2008.
 Zaim Chiflik

Bosnia and Herzegovina 

 Baljci, Tomislavgrad, is a village that became abandoned after the Bosnian War.
 Milodraž, a medieval village that is today located in Pobrđe Milodraž, Kiseljak.
 Vranduk, a village in Doboj that faced a similar fate as Baljci.
 Ledići, an almost abandoned village with only two people, Obren Miovćić, and his wife Dragana. The village had a similar fate as Vranduk and Baljci.

Croatia

Czech Republic
 , sometimes referred to as Boží Dar, is an abandoned military town in the territory of Milovice, northeast of Prague. It was abandoned following the Velvet Revolution in 1989, and ownership of the town transferred to the Czech government in 1992. It remained uninhabited until March 2014 when work was started to demolish it.

Cyprus
 Vikla

Estonia
 Viivikonna and Sirgala are former mining towns that started to lose their population after local oil shale reserves were depleted and the industry moved eastwards. By the 21st century, both towns had only a handful of people left, struggling to find a new place to live.

Faroe Islands
 Blankskáli, Kalsoy, after an avalanche hit the village in 1809, the entire village resettled in the new settlement Syðradalur on the same island. The village was finally abandoned cca. 1815.
 Fossá, Borðoy, abandoned since 1945.
 Múli, a town on Borðoy, has been considered abandoned since 2002.
 Skarð, on Kunoy, was steadily depopulated from 1913 to 1919, after all the men of the village drowned while out fishing.
 Skarvanes is a village on Sandoy, that has been abandoned since the last permanent resident died in 2000.
 Skálatoftir is the northwesternmost village on Borðoy.
 Slættanes is a town on Vágar that was abandoned in 1965.
 Strond, located north of Ánir, has been abandoned since 1930.
 Víkar, a town on Vágar, has been abandoned since 1910.
 Víkarbyrgi, on Suðuroy, was abandoned in 2003.

Finland
 Jussarö is an old village near the Jussarö mines.

France

 Six of the French villages destroyed in World War I have never been rebuilt. All are found in the département of Meuse, and were destroyed during the Battle of Verdun in 1916:
 Beaumont-en-Verdunois
 Bezonvaux
 Cumières-le-Mort-Homme
 Fleury-devant-Douaumont
 Haumont-près-Samogneux
 Louvemont-Côte-du-Poivre
 Oradour-sur-Glane was destroyed by a Waffen-SS battalion during World War II and its population massacred. The village was subsequently rebuilt nearby, but the ruins of the old village have been preserved.

Germany
 Open-pit coal mining in several areas of Germany creates ghost towns in preparation for the coal mining. Towns are evacuated several years in advance and turned into ghost towns. When the pit reaches the towns they are finally torn down.
 Bonnland, Gruorn, Lopau, Wollseifen and others are ghost towns created as part of the creation of military training areas.

Greece
 The island of Spinalonga is considered by some to be a ghost town. Serving as a leper colony for the first half of the 20th century, the island was abandoned when all its inhabitants were cured. By 1962 there were no permanent residents left. In recent years Spinalonga has become a tourist attraction as one of the last leper colonies to be closed down in Europe.
 Gavros, Kranionas and Ano Kraniounas are all abandoned villages located near Kastoria and Lake Prespa.
 The castle of Kato Chora is located near the village of Mylopotamos, Kythera.
 Old Perithia (or Palea Perithia) is a ghost village on the northern side of Corfu on the slopes of Mount Pantokrator. The village was originally established in the 14th century, during Byzantine times due to the need of people to move from the coastal side and protect themselves from pirate and enemy attacks. Moreover, the diseases caused by mosquitoes on the coast drove residents to the mountain. When piracy was confronted from the Mediterranean Sea in the late 19th century, some inhabitants started to gradually move to the coasts where tourism had also started to develop.

Hungary
 Béndekpuszta
 Derenk, was destroyed by the government, so that the area could be used for hunting.
 Gyertyánvölgy was one of the four settlements created by the workers of the glass huts founded in the 18th century. The other three settlements were Óhuta (today Bükkszentlászló), Újhuta (today Bükkszentkereszt) and Répáshuta (which still exists). The last glass hut operated here until 1897; the village was still inhabited at the beginning of the 20th century. In its cemetery, the first burial was in 1843, and the last in 1926.
 Gyűrűfű was repopulated in the form of an eco-village.
 Hertelendyújhely
 Iharkút: its fate was sealed by the discovery of the bauxite wealth below. The extraction started in 1979. The village's last inhabitants were moved to Bakonyjákó, Németbánya, Herend and Pápa.
 Jásztelekpuszta: its fate is similar to Kápolnapuszta.
 Kakpuszta: the inhabitants were moved because of the lack of road construction and electrification.
 Kápolnapuszta: the 2nd Ukrainian Reconnaissance Front of the Red Army exterminated nearly the entire population on March 16, 1945.
 Márcadópuszta
 Mónosokor
 Nagyecsér, the most famous ghost town in Hungary. It was abandoned following school closure, an aging population, and the population leaving; the road to Mezőnagymihály was never built.
 Nagygéc, was totally destroyed by the 1970s Szamos flooding; there is now a memorial park for the town.
 Révfalu, an isolated village, nowadays a popular tourist destination.
 Somogyszentimre
 Szentkirályszabadja, although the village is still populated, a small city sized Soviet military base is totally abandoned next to it. The settlement also has an airport, as well as panel buildings, shops, cinema, theater, kindergarten, and school for the families of the soldiers. The area was left when the soviet soldiers were withdrawn from Hungary in 1990. The airport operates to this day. This base is often called the Hungarian Chernobyl.
 Vágotpuszta
 Zelemér, the Tatars ravaged whole of Northern Hungary including this village, which failed to revive.
 Zsörk, the second-most famous ghost town in the country.

Iceland 
 The former village of Súðavík, in the Westfjords, a remote region of NW Iceland. In 1995, an avalanche fell on the small village, resulting in 14 fatalities. It was later decided that the location of the town was unsafe for year-round occupation. It has been forbidden ever since to live in the old town permanently. A new village was built from the ground up a few miles away from the old site in a safer location.

Ireland
 Miners' Village, Glendalough, County Wicklow was a small village based around a galena mine. The village was largely inhabited from 1825 to 1957 when the mine closed permanently.
 Great Blasket Island, County Kerry, was evacuated in 1953 after being repeatedly cut off from the mainland due to poor weather. Its 160 residents were relocated to the mainland by the government.
 Innisfallen Island is the site of Innisfallen Abbey, once home to Finian Lobhar.
 Rindoon, County Roscommon, was deserted by the 14th century.
 Slievemore is a deserted village on Achill Island.
 Scattery Island is the site of a former village and monastery, and was once the home of Saint Senan.

Italy

  is a village in Aliano municipality, evacuated after the 1980 Irpinia earthquake.
 Argentiera is a former mining town in Sassari that suffered a population decline after World War II.
 Avi, Piedmont.
 Balestrino, a town and municipality in Liguria whose old town was abandoned in 1953.
 Bussana Vecchia is a town in Liguria that was abandoned following an earthquake in 1887.
 Campomaggiore is a town in Potenza.
 Cirella vecchia is the old town of Cirella.
 Civita di Bagnoregio is a town in Lazio that declined over the 16th and 17th centuries.
 Connio Vecchio (Old Connio), Piedmont.
 Consonno, Olginate.
 Craco, in the province of Matera, was depopulated in the middle of the 20th century, due to a landslide and the subsequent emigration. The abandonment has made Craco a popular filming location for movies such as The Nativity Story, The Passion of the Christ and Quantum of Solace.
 Herculaneum was mostly destroyed and buried under of ash and pumice in the eruption of Mount Vesuvius in 79 AD.
 Melito Vecchio (Old Melito), Avellino.
 Monteruga, Apulia.
 Pentedattilo, in Calabria, was severely damaged by the 1783 Calabrian earthquakes, and was completely abandoned by the 1960s.
 Poggioreale is a town in Sicily that was destroyed by the 1968 Belice earthquake.
 Pompeii was mostly destroyed and buried under of ash and pumice in the eruption of Mount Vesuvius in 79 AD.
 Poveglia is an abandoned island that was once a quarantine station for Plague Victims and other victims of several diseases up until the 20th Century.
 Roghudi Vecchio (Old Roghudi), Calabria.
 Roveraia, ghost village situated near , in the municipality of Loro Ciuffenna, in province of Arezzo, in Tuscany. During World War II it was an important partisan base and it was definitively abandoned in the 1980s, when the last family who lived here, left the village. Two projects have been proposed for the recovery of the village:  in 2011 the proposal of Movimento Libero Perseo Roveraia eco - lab, based on sustainability  and in 2019 there was a proposal aiming to recover the village with a mix of functions called Ecomuseum of Pratomagno.
It sits atop of mining tunnels running from one valley to the other. It is now part of the Monteneve mining museum.
 Tocco Caudio, in Benevento, was abandoned following the 1980 Irpinia earthquake.
 Leri Cavour is an abandoned village in Piedmont, situated next to a defunct nuclear reactor. Its most impressive building is the mansion of Camillo Cavour, who is famous for his efforts in creating a united Italy.

Latvia
 Skrunda-1, the site of a former Soviet Hen House radar installation, is a ghost town that was auctioned off in its entirety in early 2010.
 Irbene, the site of a former Soviet secret radar center "Звезда".

Netherlands
Many villages in the Netherlands were lost to the sea, see List of settlements lost to floods in the Netherlands for the complete list.
 Schokland, this was a very large island in the Middle Ages, but due to the rising sea level in the Zuiderzee, the island became smaller and smaller until the island was demolished by a storm in 1825. The three villages on the island: Emmeloord, Molenbuurt and Middelbuurt were abandoned. When the Noordoostpolder was created, this piece of land became visible again. Emmeloord was rebuilt on a different location in the Noordoostpolder.
 Waterdunen, this town was lost to the North Sea in 1357. Later when the land was reclaimed the town was rebuilt, only to be lost again a century later. One of many Dutch villages to be lost to the North Sea, list of flooded villages in Zeeland.
 Bommenede, the village was flooded on January 26, 1682. The destruction was so great, that the Estates of Holland decided not to rebuild the village, and the last inhabitants left in 1684. Some remains of the village (now sometimes referred to as Oud-Bommenede) still remain visible. Nowadays, there is still some overgrown debris in the waters of the Grevelingen.

Norway
 Pyramiden ("The Pyramid") was a Russian settlement and coal mining community on the archipelago of Svalbard. It was founded by Sweden in 1910, and sold to the Soviet Union in 1927. The settlement, with a onetime population of 1,000 inhabitants, was abandoned in the late 1990s by its owner, the state-owned Soviet company Trust Artikugol, and is now a ghost town.

Poland
 Czerwona Woda ("Red Water") in Kłodzko Valley was established by German immigrants before WWII. Most of the abandoned houses are found in the mountains of Klodzko Valley.
 Kłomino, near Borne Sulinowo in the northwest part of the country, was established as a place of residence for Soviet troops stationed in Poland with their families. The population was about 5,000. It was completely depopulated by 1992 after the collapse of the USSR. Only a few families live there now, but there are plans to repopulate the city.

Bieszczady National Park is home to several abandoned settlements:
 Beniowa
 Bukowiec
 Dydiowa
 Dźwiniacz Górny
 Krywka
 Łokieć
 Sianki
 Sokoliki Górskie
 Tarnawa Wyżna

Portugal 

 Picões, in the freguesia of Bouçoães, Valpaços, Vila Real District
 Vilarinho da Furna, Terras de Bouro, at Braga District was a village with unique rules and way of life. It was abandoned and submerged in 1972 due to the building of Vilarinho das Furnas hydroelectric dam. When the lagoon water level is low the remains of the buildings can be seen.
 Aldeia de Broas , at Mafra Municipality, was officially considered abandoned when the last inhabitant died in late 1960 after being populated for centuries.

Romania
126 localities in Romania are "fictitious". They either have no inhabitants according to the last census, or they are actually in the bottom of an accumulation lake or have completely disappeared from the face of the earth. Some villages have no construction, no access roads, but they continue to remain in the official data bases of the Romanian state. Some of the localities that did not have any inhabitants at the 2011 census are:
 Baștea
 Bezidou Nou, flooded, the symbol of the Systematization
 Bold, flooded during the construction of Stânca-Costești Dam
 Bunești
 Cucu, destroyed during the floods of 14 May 1970
 Eteni, had the same fate as Cucu
 Ganaș
 Geamăna, flooded in 1978 by the Valea Șesii decant pond
 Gherdeal
 Giurcuța de Jos, flooded during the construction of Fântânele Dam
 Grabicina de Sus, moved in the second half of the 20th century due to landslides
 Incești
 Lindenfeld, depopulated since 1998, with the death of its last resident, Paul Schwirzenbeck
 Loțu
 Văgaș

Spain

 Belchite, in the province of Zaragoza, Aragon, is one of the most well-known ghost towns in Spain. Before the 1930s, Belchite was a growing city, with many services. As a consequence of the Battle of Belchite, during the Spanish Civil War, the city was totally destroyed. Instead of a reconstruction, Franco decided to keep the ruins of the old town of Belchite intact as a memorial of the battle. As of 1964, the town was totally deserted, the inhabitants having been removed to Belchite Nuevo, on the side of the old town. The ruins, which are not accommodated for tourism, are visited by more than 10,000 tourists annually. It is also a well-known meeting point for Francoist nostalgics, especially Falangists.
 Granadilla, Extremadura
 Aldealcardo, Soria
 La Cornudilla, Valencia
 Erillcastell, near El Pont de Suert, Catalonia
 Esperan, near El Pont de Suert, Catalonia
 Jánovas, Fiscal
 Lacort, Fiscal
 Llombai in the Vall de Gallinera, Alacant
 Ochate, Condado de Treviño, Burgos, Castille and Leon
 Peranera, near El Pont de Suert, Catalonia
 Pernui in Sort, Lleida, Catalonia
 Viuet, near El Pont de Suert, Catalonia

Sweden
 Laver
 Såtenäs villa-city
 Messaure
 Harsprånget
 Tacketorp
 Old Grängesberg
 Folkesta in Eskilstuna

Ukraine 

After the Chernobyl nuclear disaster in 1986, hundreds of settlements within the exclusion zone were evacuated. Some have remained abandoned ever since, including:
 Chernobyl
 Kopachi
 Opachychi
 Pripyat
 Poliske
 Tarasy
 Velyki Klishchi
 Yaniv

United Kingdom
Also see List of lost settlements in the United Kingdom

England 
 Birchinlee in Derbyshire was a village built by the Derwent Valley Water Board for the workers (and their families) who constructed the Derwent and Howden Dams between 1902 and 1916.
 Derwent in Derbyshire was demolished in the 1940s to make way for the Ladybower Reservoir.
 Cuddington was a hamlet in Surrey that was demolished in the sixteenth century so that Nonsuch Palace (itself later demolished) could be built.
 Dunwich, a once-thriving town on the Suffolk coast, began to decline in 1286 when a storm swept much of it into the sea. Subsequent storms and coastal erosion have since claimed all but a few of the remaining buildings.
 Ewden Village in the Civil Parish of Stocksbridge was a timber-built village, completed in 1929 to house workers working on the Morehall and Broomhead reservoirs.
 Hallsands is a coastal village in Devon that was destroyed by a storm in 1917.
 Hambleton, in Rutland, is a civil parish that once included the settlements of Middle Hambleton and Nether Hambleton, which were both flooded in 1975 to create Rutland Water.
 Heathrow, a small village in Middlesex, was demolished in 1944 so that London Heathrow airport could be built.
 Mardale Green in the Lake District was demolished and flooded in 1935 to create Haweswater Reservoir.
 Martinsthorpe, in Rutland, is one of the few civil parishes in England to have a population of zero.
 Ravenser Odd is a village on the coast of the East Riding of Yorkshire, that was swept away in the Grote Mandrenke storm of 1362.
 Ravenspurn, also on the coast of the East Riding of Yorkshire, south of Ravenser Odd, and near Spurn Head, was abandoned in the 19th century and was swept into the North Sea.
 Samson is a remote island of the Isles of Scilly that has been deserted since 1855.
 Shipden, in Norfolk, was washed into the sea in the 14th century.
 Tide Mills in East Sussex was condemned as unfit for habitation and abandoned in 1939.
 Wyck, a deserted medieval village in West Tisbury, abandoned in the 14th century.

In 1942 and 1943, in preparation for the Allied assault on Normandy, several villages were evacuated to be used as training grounds for the British Army and U.S. forces. This was intended to be a temporary arrangement, but many of the villages remained abandoned, and are used for military training to this day. Some of these villages are listed below; most of them are located within the Stanford Battle Area in Norfolk.
 Buckenham Tofts, Norfolk
 Imber, Wiltshire
 Langford, Norfolk
 Stanford, Norfolk
 Sturston, Norfolk
 Tottington, Norfolk
 Tyneham, Dorset
 West Tofts, Norfolk

Scotland
 Boreraig, on the Isle of Skye, was one of many villages that were forcibly evacuated by Scottish aristocrats in the 18th and 19th centuries.
 Bothwellhaugh, in North Lanarkshire, is a former coal mining town that now lies under Strathclyde Loch.
 Hallaig, on the island of Raasay, depopulated as part of the Highland Clearances and subject of a famous Gaelic poem by Sorley MacLean.
 Mingulay, an island at the southern end of the Outer Hebrides, depopulated as part of the ongoing effects of the Highland Clearances, the village on the island finally abandoned in 1912.
 The Monach Islands, also known as Heisker, in the Outer Hebrides; the village abandoned in 1932 and depopulated in 1942 with the closure of the lighthouse.
 North Rona is a remote Scottish island that has been deserted since 1844.
 Scarp, whose last permanent inhabitants left for nearby Harris in 1971. Site of Gerhard Zucker's experiments with rocket mail.
 Saint Kilda is an archipelago in the Outer Hebrides that was abandoned in 1930, and is now a World Heritage Site.

Wales
 Capel Celyn in Gwynedd was flooded in 1965 to create the reservoir Llyn Celyn.
 Nant Gwrtheyrn in Gwynedd is a former quarry town that became abandoned during World War II, but is now the site of a Welsh language learning centre.

North America

Antigua and Barbuda
 Codrington was a town on the island of Barbuda, it has since been abandoned following Hurricane Irma.

Canada

Costa Rica
 Cinchona (Sarapiquí, Alajuela) was destroyed by the 2009 Costa Rica earthquake, which left 25 people dead and five missing.

Greenland

Mexico
 San Juan Parangaricutiro is a village in Michoacán that was buried by ash and lava in 1943, during the formative eruption of Parícutin.
 Ojuela, a mining town near Durango City, was abandoned when the area's ore supply was exhausted.
 Quiahuiztlan.
 Real de Catorce was once a flourishing silver mining town in northern Mexico. Its dramatic landscapes and buildings have been used by Hollywood for movies such as The Mexican (2001) with Brad Pitt and Julia Roberts. Recent efforts to adapt the town to tourism have created a mixture of ghost town and heritage tourist site adapted to visitors in search of interesting history in the country.
 San Antonio de la Iguana, Nuevo León
 Thompson's Landing was a port at the mouth of the Colorado River. During the early settlement of Arizona, shallow-draft steamboats plied the lower reaches of the river.

Montserrat
 Plymouth was once the seat of government in Montserrat, and home to around 4,000 people, until it was almost completely destroyed by the Soufrière Hills volcano in 1997. The entire southern half of the island is now off-limits, leaving over 30 villages and towns abandoned.

Saint Pierre and Miquelon
 L'Île-aux-Marins ("Sailor's Island") is a ghost town/island located a few miles away from the island of Saint-Pierre. Once inhabited by over 600 fishermen, families and tradesmen, the island was progressively abandoned until the last inhabitant left in 1965. The island is now a tourist attraction.

United States

Oceania

Australia

 Old Adaminaby drowned by new lake of Snowy Mountains Hydro-Electric scheme. Town relocated.
 Ballara is an abandoned copper mining town in Queensland.
 Betoota, in Queensland, is the smallest designated town in Australia; its last permanent resident died in 2004.
 Big Bell is a former mining town in Western Australia.
 Boydtown, in New South Wales, was originally settled and then abandoned in the 1840s. It remained abandoned until the 1930s. It is now a growing town with commercial and residential developments.
 Broad Arrow was a gold rush town in Western Australia that had been abandoned by the 1920s.
 Calcifer was a mining town established on the Atherton Tablelands in 1894, abandoned by 1907.
 Cassilis was a gold rush town in Victoria that declined during the First World War.
 Collingwood in Queensland was established in 1878, but abandoned about 1900 when it was outcompeted as a regional centre by nearby Winton. There is a commemorative marker at the old graveyard listing eight persons known to be buried there.
 Cook is an isolated town in South Australia built around a railway station, which was closed down in 1997.
 Copperfield is a former copper mining town in Queensland.
 Cossack in Western Australia was a flourishing port town in the 1800s, and profited greatly from the pearling industry. It began to decline during the 20th century.
 Crotty in Western Tasmania was abandoned when the nearby mine closed down. It is now submerged beneath Lake Burbury.
 Cudgegong was a small town in central western New South Wales. Windamere dam now exists where the town once stood, but ruins can be seen in times of drought when the dam dries up.
 Denison Town in New South Wales.
 Farina in South Australia was abandoned when its settlers found that the climate was unsuitable for arable farming.
 Glen Davis in New South Wales was the centre of an oil shale industry during the Second World War; the mine was closed down in 1952.
 Goldsworthy is a former iron ore mining town in Western Australia.
 Gwalia in Western Australia was abandoned when its gold mine closed down in 1963.
 Hill End in New South Wales was never fully abandoned and is now a popular tourist town.
 Iron Baron is a former mining town in South Australia.
 Jay Creek in the Northern Territory was a government settlement for Indigenous Australians in the 1920s and 30s.
 Joadja is a former mining town in New South Wales that had become abandoned by 1911.
 Kanowna is a town in Western Australia that flourished during a gold rush in the late 19th century, and declined during the Great Depression.
 Kiandra is a former gold mining town in New South Wales.
 Linda is a former mining town in Tasmania.
 Malcolm is a former gold mining town in Western Australia.
 Mary Kathleen is a former mining town in Queensland that was deserted after the mine closed down in 1982.
 Maytown is a former mining town in the Palmer River goldfields of Queensland.
 Moliagul is a former gold mining town in Victoria; it was here that the world's largest gold nugget, known as the "Welcome Stranger", was discovered in 1869.
 Mount Britton is a former gold mining town in Queensland.
 Mount Cuthbert is a former copper mining town in Queensland.
 Mount Mulligan is a former coal mining town in Queensland that closed down in 1957.
 Nannine is a former gold mining town in Western Australia.
 Newnes is a former oil shale mining site in New South Wales.
The current township of Tallangatta has approximately 1,000 residents.
 Ophir is a former gold mining town in New South Wales.
 Ora Banda is a former gold mining town in Western Australia.
 Paradise is a former gold mining town in Queensland.
 Whilst not a town, Parramatta Road in Sydney has over 100 abandoned and boarded-up stores on its  strip. The most affected suburbs on the road are Concord and Leichhardt, which would feature empty and derelict shops here and there.
 Pillinger was a port town established in Tasmania to ship ore from the nearby mines.
 Ravenswood in north-eastern Queensland was a ghost town for many years, due to the declining gold rushes, but new gold discoveries in the area and improved mineral processing technologies have boosted the economy of the area and revived the town.
 Selwyn in the Shire of Cloncurry, Queensland, is a former copper mining town.
 Shay Gap in Western Australia's Pilbara region was a company town that existed for roughly 20 years until the iron ore mining ceased in 1993.
 Silverton is a former silver mining town in New South Wales that was deserted when more lucrative silver-lead-zinc ore was discovered at nearby Broken Hill.
 Tarcoon, New South Wales
 Walhalla, Victoria, was never fully abandoned and has now become a popular tourist town.
 Western Tyers, a timber community in Victoria, was abandoned after the timber mill closed in 1969.
 Whroo, a former mining town in Victoria.
 Wittenoom in Western Australia was the country's only source of blue asbestos (crocidolite) in the 1950s and 60s. The mine was shut down in 1966, and the residents of the town were gradually relocated, due to concerns that the asbestos in the air posed a danger to their health.
 Yerranderie is a former silver mine in New South Wales.

New Zealand 
 Denniston was a coal mining town in the West Coast Region of the South Island of New Zealand. Formerly with a population of around 1400, it now has about ten residents.
 Jamestown was a settlement in what is now Fiordland National Park.
 Kelso was abandoned after severe and repeated flooding in the late 1970s and early 1980s.
 Lyell was a gold mining town in the Buller Gorge in the South Island.
 Macetown was a gold rush town in Central Otago that started to decline during the 20th century.
 Nenthorn was an Otago gold mining town from 1888 until the 1890s, abandoned when its mining efforts collapsed. Only two ruined buildings and the remains of a battery remain.
Port Craig is a former logging township on the southwest coast of the South Island.
Port Molyneux was a port at the mouth of the Clutha River in Otago. After a flood caused the river mouth to move, the town was abandoned.
Port Pegasus was a township on the south coast of Stewart Island in southern New Zealand.
 Rotowaro, a coal mining town, was removed in the 1980s to make way for an opencast mine. It is the site of the now abandoned Rotowaro Carbonisation Plant.
 Te Hutewai was a very small farming community located around 10 km south of Raglan, in the Waikato District. A school was built but was burnt down in the 1960s and the area today is now farmland.
 Te Wairoa, also called "The Buried Village", was a small Māori village that was destroyed by the 1886 eruption of Mount Tarawera.
 Venture, a small beech bark processing settlement in the Awaroa Inlet of the Abel Tasman National Park, was abandoned as the value of the bark declined and the cost of transport increased into the remote area. The remains of the foundations of the school house and assorted buildings remain in the bush today, although fire, time and the encroachment of the bush has rendered the ruins little more than a collection of stones and bricks. The settlement can only be reached by walking up a rarely used and poorly maintained track at low tide. The settlement and track are on the estate administered by the Department of Conservation.
 Waiuta was a gold mining town in the West Coast Region of the South Island of New Zealand until 1951.

South America

Argentina
 The small lakeside resort town of Villa Epecuén was abandoned on 10 November 1985, after a series of heavy rains caused the lake water levels to rise and flood the town. The remains of the town re-emerged on 11 May 2013, when the waters of the lake receded.

Brazil
 The small village of Caraíbas, in the municipality of Itacarambi, suffered a rare earthquake in the early morning of 9 December 2007. It measured 4.9 on the Richter scale. Located over a geological fault, the village of 76 families was evacuated and has been abandoned ever since.
 Fordlândia was established by American industrialist Henry Ford in 1928 near Santarém. This was done to mass-produce natural rubber. Built in inadequate terrain, designed with no knowledge of tropical agriculture, and managed with little regard for local culture, the enterprise was an absolute failure; in 1934, the Ford factory was relocated to Belterra, but ultimately closed down in 1945.

Chile 
 Chaitén is a small city in southern Chile that was heavily damaged by a volcanic eruption.
 Humberstone and Santa Laura Saltpeter Works are two former saltpeter refineries that have been declared a UNESCO World Heritage Site.
 Port Famine is possibly Chile's oldest ghost town. It was founded in the Strait of Magellan in 1584 by Pedro Sarmiento de Gamboa. Starvation and the cold climate killed all of the inhabitants. The English navigator Sir Thomas Cavendish landed at the site in 1587. He found only ruins of the settlement, and renamed the place "Port Famine".
 Sewell is a former mining town that was once home to at least 14,000 people.

Colombia
 Armero was left in ruins by a volcanic eruption in 1985 that killed over 20,000 inhabitants. Survivors of the tragedy left for other towns, and Armero is currently unpopulated.
 Bojayá is a small town in the Chocó department, that was attacked by the Revolutionary Armed Forces of Colombia (FARC) on May 2, 2002. Most of the inhabitants hid in the church; A FARC mortar bomb landed in the building, killing approximately 140 people, including 40 children. Today, Bojayá is a ghost town and though plans have been made to rebuild it, it will not be on the exact location of the massacre.

French Guiana
 Guisanbourg was the former administrative centre of what is now Régina. The discovery of gold in 1855, lead to its demise, and in the mid-1980s, the last citizen left the town.

Guyana 
 Jonestown was established in the 1970s by members of the Peoples Temple, led by Jim Jones. On November 18, 1978, Jones orchestrated a mass suicide, resulting in the death of 913 of Jonestown's 1,110 inhabitants. The town now stands in ruins, and is being slowly reclaimed by the jungle.

Peru 
 Machu Picchu was built during the Inca Empire and is now a popular tourist site.

Venezuela 
 Potosí was a Venezuelan town in the western state of Táchira. The town was deliberately flooded by the Venezuelan government in 1985 to build a hydroelectric dam. In 2010, the town was uncovered for the first time since its flooding due to a drought caused by the weather phenomenon called El Niño.

See also
 Deadwood, South Dakota – an example of a historic town that almost became a ghost town in the 1960s, but revived as a tourist attraction.
 :Category:Ghost towns
 Ghost town

References

External links

 GhostTowns.com
 Coloradopast.com – Colorado ghost town and historic pictures
 GhostTownsCanada.ca Many pictures of Canadian ghost towns